Jacques Bonne-Gigault de Bellefonds (1698–1746) was a French prelate who was Archbishop of Arles from 1741 to 1746.

Biography

Jacques Bonne-Gigault de Bellefonds was born at the Château de Montifray, near Beaumont-la-Ronce, on 1 May 1698.

He was appointed Bishop of Bayonne on 8 October 1735.  Pope Clement XII confirmed this appointment on 27 February 1736 and Cardinal Melchior de Polignac, Archbishop of Auch, consecrated Jacques Bonne-Gigault de Bellefonds as a bishop on 25 March 1736.  On 20 August 1741 he was appointed Archbishop of Arles, with Pope Benedict XIV confirming the appointment on 20 December 1741.

Jacques Bonne-Gigault de Bellefonds was appointed Archbishop of Paris on 4 March 1746, with Benedict XIV confirming the appointment on 2 May 1746. He died in Paris of smallpox only months after becoming Archbishop, on 20 July 1746.

His career was marked by his opposition to Jansenism within the Catholic Church in France.  Shortly before his death from smallpox, he had denounced the Pensées philosophiques by Denis Diderot.

References
This page is based on this page from French Wikipedia.
Profile from www.catholic-hierarchy.org

1698 births
1746 deaths
Archbishops of Paris
18th-century peers of France
Dukes of Saint-Cloud
Burials at Notre-Dame de Paris